Sjoerd Lambertus "Bertus" Mooi Wilten (30 November 1913 – 27 June 1965) was a Dutch swimmer. He joined the swimming club HPC in Heemstede. In 1934-35 he broke the Dutch national record on the 100 m freestyle twice for the long course and four times for the short course, reaching 1:00.6 in February 1935.
He competed in the men's 100 metre freestyle at the 1936 Summer Olympics, but was eliminated in the second heat.

References

External links
 

1913 births
1965 deaths
Dutch male freestyle swimmers
Olympic swimmers of the Netherlands
Swimmers at the 1936 Summer Olympics
People from Semarang
20th-century Dutch people